Seymour Lake is located in the town of Morgan in Orleans County, Vermont, an area known as the Northeast Kingdom. The lake was named for Israel Seymour, one of the original grantees. Natives called it Namagonic ("salmon trout spearing place"). It is one of only two deep, cold, and oligotrophic lakes in the Clyde River system.

It is shaped like a giant number "7". The lake is fed by two primary streams, an outlet from Mud Pond and Sucker Brook. The lake drains into Echo Pond, which empties into the Clyde River, Lake Memphremagog and, eventually, Canada's St. Lawrence River.

A dam is used for hydroelectric power. Construction on the dam was completed in 1928. It is owned by Citizens Utilities Company.
 
The dam is made of stone with a concrete core. The foundation is soil.

The dam was rebuilt in 2004.

Footnotes

External links
 Photos of Lake Seymour
 

Morgan, Vermont
Seymour
Seymour